Tiragabadda Telugubidda is a 1988 Indian Telugu-language action film, produced by Nandamuri Harikrishna under the Tejaswi Productions banner and directed by A. Kodandarami Reddy. It stars Nandamuri Balakrishna, Bhanupriya  and music composed by Chakravarthy.

Plot
The film begins with Ravi Teja a lionhearted released from prison. Forthwith, he reaches the Police parade ground and spins rearward. Prior, Ravi Teja is a stout-hearted cop one that swears to protect the integrity & sovereignty of the nation. Ravi Teja's darling Padma dotes on his sister Deepa and shares the same with Jhansi daughter of Justice Jaganatha Rao. Besides, Mayor Seshupal Rao is malignant and undertakes malpractice undercover of righteousness. Ravi Teja always antagonizes him, and the battle erupts. Once, Phani son of Seshupal Rao indignities and afflicts Jhansi when Ravi Teja red-handedly apprehends him. However, he escapes from the sentence with the fake alibis. After a while, the government announces to dole out lands for the patriots of the freedom fight, and Seshupal Rao ploys to squat it.

During that plight, Ravi Teja shields the innocent and successfully allocates the lands to the original. Just as a vengeance, Seshupal Rao kills Deepa in the name of the accident. Despite this, Ravi Teja realizes the actuality, and collars Seshupal Rao acquits as guiltless by manipulating the evidence. In turn, Ravi Teja is arraigned for his gross misconduct when Jaganatha Rao is compelled to terminate and penalize him. Right-back, Ravi Teja outrages Seshupal Rao as a common man. Tragically, begrudged Phani mauls Jhansi bearing the past and she commits suicide in the court hall in the presence of her father. Then, Jaganath Rao deprecates himself and as amends, he retrieves Ravi Teja back to duty. Knowing that Seshupal Rao's base camp is situated on an island near the town of Kotipalli he takes charge therein. At last, Ravi Teja collapses Seshupal Rao's dynasty. Finally, the movie ends with the government honoring Ravi Teja with The Gold Medal.

Cast

Nandamuri Balakrishna as Inspector Ravi Teja
Bhanupriya as Padma
Rao Gopal Rao as Mayor Sishipal Rao
Jaggayya as Justice Jaganatha Rao 
Nutan Prasad as Dr. Chathurvedi
Giri Babu as Brahmanandam
P. L. Narayana as Dasaradharamaiah
Chalapathi Rao as Ramudu
Bhimeswara Rao as I.G.
Rajesh as Phani
KK Sarma as Priest
Ramana Reddy as Pakiru
Chitti Babu 
Jeevita Rajashekar as Jhansi 
Varalakshmi as Rupa
Annuja as Kuchala Kumari
Anitha as Ravi Teja's mother
Sujatha as Sulochana
Ragini as Sishipal Rao's wife 
Nirmalamma as Tulasamma

Soundtrack

Music was composed by Chakravarthy and released by LEO Audio Company. Lyrics were written by Veturi.

References

1988 films
1980s Telugu-language films
Films directed by A. Kodandarami Reddy
Films scored by K. Chakravarthy